Upstart or upstarts may refer to:
HMS Upstart, a Royal Navy U-class submarine
Upstart (company), an online lending marketplace
Upstart (software), a process management daemon used in several operating systems.
Upstart (sculpture), a public art work at the Lynden Sculpture Garden near Milwaukee
Upstart (horse), winner of the Dicken Medal
Angelic Upstarts, British punk band
Upstarts (comics), a group of comic book characters
Upstarts (film), a 2019 Indian film
The Upstarts, a 2017 book by Brad Stone
The Upstart, a 1998 novel by Catherine Cookson
 Upstart Associates, an artists' studio formed by four well-known comics artists

See also
Startup (disambiguation)